Hajizai is a town and union council in Charsadda District of Khyber-Pakhtunkhwa. It is located at 34°6'50N 71°28'36E and has an altitude of 311 metres (1023 feet).

References

Union councils of Charsadda District
Populated places in Charsadda District, Pakistan